Channel A Corporation, known as Channel A (Hangul: 채널A, typeset CHANNEL A), is a nationwide  generalist cable TV network and broadcasting company in South Korea. The company's largest shareholder is Dong-A Media Group (DAMG), which consists of 12 affiliate companies including The Dong-a Ilbo. Channel A was launched on 1 December 2011. Channel A's management philosophy is 'Open & Creative' and the company slogan is 'Channel A, A Canvas that Holds Your Dreams.' JaeHo Kim currently serves as the chief executive officer of Channel A.

Channel A is one of four newly launched South Korea nationwide generalist cable TV networks alongside JoongAng Ilbo's JTBC, Chosun Ilbo's TV Chosun and Maeil Kyungje's MBN in 2011. The four new networks supplement existing conventional free-to-air TV networks like KBS, MBC, SBS, and other smaller channels launched following deregulation in 1990.

History

1963–1980: Dong-A Broadcasting Station (radio) 
Dong-A Broadcasting System (DBS, Hangul: 동아방송) was established on April 25, 1963.

DBS' first ever radio drama show and South Korea's first docudrama, Yeomyeong 80 Years, aired every night (between 22:15 and 22:35). Since broadcasters at the time were only airing melodramas and soap operas, Yeomyeong 80 Years was a radical debut of a new drama genre in South Korean radio history. It stopped airing in 1964 and during the same year, the show was made into a six-book novel series and received the Hankook Ilbo Publishing Award. Delightful Livingroom, DBS' oldest radio show, was a talk show where different guests visited the set ("livingroom") and talk about different topics in humorous, sarcastic, and satirical manner. This show is also considered as South Korea's first talk show on neither TV or radio.

DBS' music programme, Top Tune Show was the harbinger of radio Disc Jockey genre in South Korea. Other stations' music shows at the time were employing professional announcers as their presenters and the producers of the show would do the audio mixing separately. However, Top Tune Show first employed an integrated system where a single music-knowledgeable producer do everything from mixing, presenting to adding commentaries. Following Top Tune Shows popularity, similar music-genre programmes such as 'Dial at 3pm' and 'Dial at 0 hour' debuted. In these programmes, there was a common segment called the 'Request Corner.' In this segment, listeners will call in to request their desired song to be played live and this was possible due to DBS retaining a comparably large music library with more than 2000 world music records.

DBS' What do you think? is the world's first "town meeting" program which started in 1965. It was a live debate show dealing with different political and economical issues. This show was an extremely radical program considering the oppressive military regime at the time where freedom of press was severely restricted. Furthermore, Hyun-Doo Kang, Seoul National University's honorary professor and former professor of journalism commented, "DBS will be recorded as the most brave station in the history of broadcasting."

In 1966, DBS was able to live broadcast the 37th Dong-A Marathon and this was first time to live broadcast a full marathon race in South Korean radio history. Furthermore, in 1964, DBS was the first broadcaster in South Korea to build a satellite studio in Midopa Department Store in Myeongdong.

In 1976, DBS Monday through Tuesday radio drama Pretty Boy Got the number one spot with 97.3%, achieving an all-kill against MBC's Nationwide News 8, KBS's Evening News and TBC's FM Latest Inkigayo on its time slot. No other radio program has break this record until now. In November 1980, DBS permanently discontinued airing due to the government's mandatory merger decision and was integrated with Korean Broadcasting System. On December 25, 1980, Dong-A Broadcasting Station closed due to the mandatory merger to the Korean Broadcasting System by the military government forces resulting in the launching of KBS Radio Seoul. In 1991, Dong-A Broadcasting Station's Frequency of 792 kHz is transferred to Seoul Broadcasting System. On January 1, 2000, Construction completion of Dong-A Media Center. On July 22, 2009, Amendment of Media law passed the national assembly to deregulate the media market of South Korea.

2011–present: Broadcasting of Channel A and DBS 
On December 31, 2010, JTBC, TV Chosun, MBN, and Channel A are selected as "General Cable Television Channel Broadcasters".

On December 1, 2011, Channel A begins broadcasting.

On December 7, 2011, Construction on the Dong-A Digital Media Center (DDMC) begins.

On March 2, 2012, STORY NETWORKS is established.

In 2012, Channel A broadcasts the Golden Lion Pennant National High School Baseball Championship hosted by The Dong-a Ilbo.

On October 17, 2014, Construction completed on the Dong-A Digital Media Center (DDMC).

On July 1, 2015, Channel A Plus begins broadcasting.

On March 17, 2016, Channel A broadcasts the Seoul International Marathon hosted by The Dong-a Ilbo.

On December 26, 2016, Channel A B&C and Channel A Newsvision are established.

On January 26, 2018, The 30,000th edition of the Dong-A Ilbo Directive was published.

On February 20, 2019, the Korea Journalists Association awards Dong-A Ilbo the 'Korea Journalists Award' for reporting on former Minister Cho Kuk's personnel verification.

On November 27, 2019, in the Korea Communications Commission's 2018 broadcast evaluation, Channel A was ranked first with the highest score among general programming channels.

On April 1, 2020, Dong-A IIbo celebrates its 100th anniversary.

Channel A TV programmes (2011–present)

Current programmes

Past programmes

Reality & Entertainment
 Never Too Late for College
 Dog Papa
 Angry Wife
 The Farmer's Men
 MISAGO
 National Team
 Gentleman
 Top Magic
 Right Now
 24 Hours Observation Camera
 Singderella
 Mystical Tales of the Royals
 Ordinary Millionaire
 The South Meets the North
 Lookalikes
 X-File, The Food Story
 Heart Signal Season 1
 Heart Signal Season 2

Drama
 K-Pop Extreme Survival
 Happy And
 Goodbye My Wife
 Miss Panda and Mr. Hedgehog
 Color of Woman
 An Immortal Work
 Heaven's Garden
 Bachelor's Vegetable Store
 Twelve Nights
 Lie After Lie 
 Show Window: The Queen's House

Documentaries
 Exodus, Out of North Korea
 Greenland

X-File, The Food Storys Good-Natured Restaurant
Channel A's X-File, The Food Story, which began broadcasting on February 10, 2012, is an investigative crime TV show that deeply delves into the Korean food system and reports on restaurants' wrongdoings. Moreover, the staff of the show travelled around the country to locate restaurants that provide fresh and delicious food handled properly and safely and bestowed "Good-Natured Restaurant" title to these restaurants. These "Good-Natured Restaurants" became extremely popular and a huge hype.

In 2013, the viewers of the show suggested to the producers to reverify these restaurants and the producers agreed to this suggestion. For more rational and objective results, a new investigation group was formed, which consisted of 15 people with various different occupations such as college student, food columnist, culinary arts professor, and housewives. The investigation group visited each of the restaurants in the "Good-Natured Restaurant" list and went through a thorough inspection processes.

Affiliates

Newspaper affiliations
Kyeongin Ilbo, Kangwon Ilbo, Daejeon Ilbo, Kwangju Ilbo, Jeonbuk Ilbo, Maeil Ilbo, Busan Ilbo, Kyeongnam News, Jeju Ilbo

Awards and nominations

See also 
 MBC Standard FM
 SBS TV

References

External links
 
 
 
 

Conservative media in South Korea
Korean-language television stations
Television channels in South Korea
Television channels and stations established in 2011